Messelornithidae is an extinct clade of gruiform birds, closely related to modern rails. The fossil record are from the Paleocene to the early Oligocene of Europe and North America.

References

Eocene life
Messelornithidae
Prehistoric birds of Europe